"Duck Season" is the first single from Duck Season, Vol. 1, a 2002 album by West Coast DJ Babu the Dilated Junkie. It was released by Sequence Records as a 12 inch with "Ducky Boy" as its b-side in the United States, and "What Cha Know" as its b-side in Germany. The song features raps by The Beatnuts's two rappers and former group member Al' Tariq. The song's braggadocios lyrics are complemented by Babu's piano and synth-reliant beat. The song ends with Babu scratching various phrases such as "duck season" over a minimalistic beat. In addition, "Duck Season" contains scratched samples from "Beatnuts Forever" by The Beatnuts.

"Duck Season" failed to chart or receive an accompanying music video. The song is still featured on various hip hop compilation albums including Bravo Black Hits, Vol. 7 and  Major League Entertainment: The Subway Series Vol. 1.

Single track list

US 12" vinyl

A-Side
 "Duck Season (Clean)"
 "Duck Season (Main)"
 "Duck Season (Instrumentall)"

B-Side
 "Ducky Boy (Clean)"
 "Ducky Boy (Main)"
 "Ducky Boy (Instrumental)"

Germany 12" vinyl

A-Side
 "Duck Season (Album Version)"
 "Duck Season (Instrumental)"

B-Side
 "What Cha Know (Album Version)"
 "What Cha Know (Instrumental)"
 "What Cha Know (Acappella)"

References

External links
"Duck Season" audio at YouTube.

Duck Season
Duck Season
2002 songs